Durham College is an applied srts and technology in Ontario, Canada.

Durham College may also refer to:

 Durham College (17th century), a short-lived foundation of Oliver Cromwell
 Durham College (North Carolina), a closed university in Durham, North Carolina
 Durham College, Oxford, a medieval foundation whose buildings were used to found Trinity College, Oxford
 Colleges of Durham University, Durham, England
 Durham College of Science, a 19th-century college of Durham University
 Durham College Oshawa GO Station, a rail and bus station